The 2019 French F4 Championship was the ninth season to run under the guise of the French F4 Championship and the second season under the FIA Formula 4 regulations. The championship used Mygale M14-F4 chassis with an upgraded 2.0 litre engine. The series began on 20 April at Nogaro and ended on 13 October at Le Castellet. Hadrien David, who won seven races throughout the season, won the title, 57.5 points ahead of closest challenger Reshad de Gerus, who came out victorious on four occasions. Sixth-placed Enzo Valente won two races, and Nicky Hays, Victor Bernier, Gillian Henrion, Isack Hadjar, Ugo Gazil, Mikkel Grundtvig and Paul-Adrien Pallot all won one race respectively.

Driver lineup

Race calendar
A seven round calendar taking place in 3 countries is published on the FFSA Academy website.

Championship standings

Points system

Each driver dropped their worst round result. Points were awarded as follows:

Drivers' standings – FFSA Academy

Drivers' standings – FIA Formula 4

Juniors' standings

Footnotes

References

External links
 The official website of the French F4 Championship 

F4 Championship
French
French F4